Phillips Park is a municipal park in Aurora, Illinois, that includes Phillips Park Zoo. Comprising more than 325 acres, the park is managed by the Department of Parks and Recreation of the city of Aurora, and has co-owned areas with the Fox Valley Park District.

History
Travis Phillips was a merchant in Aurora who had served as an alderman in the city and as its mayor. His deep love for the area became clear when it was learned after his passing that his will designated $24,000 from his estate be used to purchase land for a park that would be donated to Aurora. On November 21, 1899, the deed of purchase was signed for 60 acres.  The land bought had been used as a picnic area for family outings as early as 1835 when it was known as Scharschug's Woods, and was built up as an entertain area in the early 1870s by the Aurora Sharp Shooter Society.  At the time of its purchase it was called City Park, though most residents simply referred to it as Phillips Park, a name the city council officially gave it in 1902. The next major historical moment for the park was March 7, 1934, when mastodon bones were found during the Phillips Park Lake Excavation Project, sponsored by the Civil Works Administration during the Great Depression. Because of the discovery of bones the lake is still referred to as Mastodon Lake. The bones have traveled to different museums over the years, but now they are housed in the visitor center of the park that was built in 2003.

Improvements by the Works Progress Administration in 1938 included planting trees and shrubs, building fireplaces and animal pens, and new cages. The park has grown over the years adding new attractions, and still continues to be a place for family outings.

Attractions

Aquatic Center:
In a joint venture the water park was constructed in 1991 and included a tube slide, a body slide and two drop-off slides, a children's play pool with a waterfall and water cannons, as well as a tot slide. There is also a hot tub, a sand play area, a sand volleyball court and concessions.

Golf Course:
The first golf course on Phillips Park grounds was constructed in the 1920s.  Improvements and renovations have created the modern course now on the grounds. The course was redesigned by Greg Martin and reopened in 2001.

Phillips Park Zoo:
Phillips Park Zoo was founded in 1915 and is still open daily with no admission.

Recreational Areas:
Sites in the park included the waterfall, World War I cannons and numerous veteran related monuments. Among the amenities are a large state-of-the-art playground, a toddler's playground, picnic pavilions, sand volleyball courts, tennis courts, horseshoe courts, a jogging/bike path, fishing piers, an ice skating pond, and a sledding hill. Special events and activities are co-sponsored throughout the year with The Friends of Phillips Park.

Sunken Gardens:
The original gardens were designed and developed by Ray Moses in the 1930s.  In 2002 the gardens were rededicated to the east side of the zoo.

Visitor Center and Mastodon Gallery:
The visitor center was built in 2003 to showcase the mastodon bones discovered in the 1934 excavation project.

References

External links

 Phillips Park website for golf course and zoo
 Fox Valley Park District: Phillips Park Aquatic Center page
 City of Aurora: The Department of Parks & Recreation page

Parks in Illinois
Geography of Aurora, Illinois
Protected areas of Kane County, Illinois
Tourist attractions in Aurora, Illinois
Works Progress Administration in Illinois
Sports in Aurora, Illinois